William R. Vance (1806–1885) was the seventh mayor of Louisville, Kentucky from 1847 to 1850. He was a Louisville attorney and member of the Whig Party elected to the Kentucky House of Representatives three times and Kentucky Senate once during the 1830s and 1840s. During his administration, he conveyed the tract of land that became Cave Hill Cemetery.

References

1806 births
1885 deaths
Kentucky lawyers
Mayors of Louisville, Kentucky
Members of the Kentucky House of Representatives
Kentucky state senators
19th-century American politicians
19th-century American lawyers